The 2012–13 NBL season was the thirty-fifth season of the NBL. There were eight teams in the competition. The regular season was played between October 5, 2012 and March 24, 2013, followed by a post-season involving the top four in April 2013. The New Zealand Breakers were the defending champions, for the second straight year.

2012–13 NBL transactions

2012–13 squads

Adelaide 36ers

Cairns Taipans

Melbourne Tigers

New Zealand Breakers

Perth Wildcats

Sydney Kings

Townsville Crocodiles

Wollongong Hawks

2012–13 All-Star teams 

North

South

2012–13 NBL season